Fântâna Mare is a commune located in Suceava County, Romania. It is composed of four villages: Cotu Băii, Fântâna Mare, Praxia and Spătărești. These were part of Vadu Moldovei Commune until 2003, when they were split off.

Natives
 Matei B. Cantacuzino

References

Communes in Suceava County
Localities in Western Moldavia